National Cycle Network (NCN) Route 165 is a Sustrans National Route that runs from Barnard Castle to Whitby.

History
The W2W was launched on 1 June 2005 as a cross-country cycle route from Walney Island in Cumbria to Sunderland on the River Wear . In 2007 a southern branch from Barnard Castle to Whitby was added. This southern branch was originally classified as regional route 52, it was upgraded to National Cycle Network Route 165 in 2012.

Route

The western trailhead is in Barnard Castle  at a junction with Route 70. Continuing on flat roads for  until it reaches the North York Moors at Great Ayton. Following the Eskdale for the final  the route crosses the River Esk four times before reaching its eastern trailhead at a junction with Route 1 on the outskirts of Whitby. This section includes several steep climbs and descents, some of them are on off-road tracks.

Related NCN routes
Route 165 is part of the W2W route along with:

Route 165 meets the following routes:
 70 at Barnard Castle
 715 at Whorlton
 65 at Hutton Rudby
 168 at Kildale
 1 at Whitby

References

External links

The official website of the W2W

Cycleways in England
National Cycle Routes